The 2019 season was Djurgårdens IF's 119th in existence, their 64th season in Allsvenskan and their 19th consecutive season in the league. They competed in Allsvenskan and the 2018–19 and 2019–20 editions of the Svenska Cupen.

Djurgården secured their 12th league title, and the first in 14 years, with a 2–2 draw away at IFK Norrköping in the last league game of the season after being down 0–2 at half-time, in a league battle that also featured Malmö FF and Hammarby IF all the way to the final day.

Squad
As it stands on 12 December, 2019

Out on loan

Transfers

In

Loans in

Out

Loans out

Released

Competitions

Allsvenskan

League table

Results summary

Results by round

Results

2018–19 Svenska Cupen

Group stage

Knockout stage

2019–20 Svenska Cupen

Group Stages take place during the 2020 season.

Squad statistics

Appearances and goals

|-
|colspan="14"|Players away from Djurgårdens on loan:

|-
|colspan="14"|Players who left Djurgårdens during the season:
|}

Goal scorers

Disciplinary record

References

Djurgårdens IF Fotboll seasons
Djurgårdens IF season
Swedish football championship-winning seasons